Anaeglis is a monotypic snout moth genus. It was described by Julius Lederer in 1863 and contains the species Anaeglis demissalis. It is found in Brazil.

References

Epipaschiinae
Monotypic moth genera
Moths of South America
Pyralidae genera